Nant Glas (or Nant-glas) is a village in the Elan Valley near Rhayader and Llandrindod Wells in Powys, Wales. It is on a side road between the A44 to the northeast and the A470 to the southwest. There is a small chapel at the southern end of the village.

The Willow Globe Theatre is close to the village, to the south just off the A470.

Gallery

References

External links
 

Villages in Powys